Philip II (1340 – 20 January 1368) was the Count of Piedmont and claimant to the Principality of Achaea briefly from 1367 to his death.

He was the son of James of Piedmont and Sibylle des Baux. On 19 September 1362, he married Alix de Thoire de Villars, but he had no children. He succeeded James, but died within a year of that date, leaving his titles to his brother Amadeus.
The paternity to Umberta a nun (Filippina de Storgi) is probably his.
Tradition says that he was saved in 1368 by intercession of the Blessed Umberto of Savoie by a medal that he carried. He lived in Fatima in Spain, and is believed to have died in 1418.

1340 births
1368 deaths
House of Savoy
Counts of Piedmont
Princes of Achaea
14th-century people from Savoy